Justin Herdman-Reed (born July 21, 1994) is a professional Canadian football linebacker for the Saskatchewan Roughriders of the Canadian Football League (CFL). He played college football with the Simon Fraser Clan.

Professional career

Toronto Argonauts
Herdman-Reed was drafted 54th overall in the 2017 CFL Draft by the Toronto Argonauts and signed with the team on May 15, 2017. He played in his first professional regular season game on July 29, 2017 against the Saskatchewan Roughriders where he had one special teams tackle. He played in 11 regular season games in 2017 where he had three defensive tackles and two special teams tackles. He finished the year on the injured list as the Argonauts won the 105th Grey Cup, bringing Herdman-Reed his first Grey Cup championship.

He played in all 18 regular season games in 2018 where he featured predominantly on special teams, recording 19 special teams tackles and three defensive tackles. For the 2019 season, Herdman-Reed had a career year as he had 37 defensive tackles, five special teams tackles, two sacks, and two forced fumbles in just 11 regular season games. He had his first two career sacks in the Labour Day Classic on September 2, 2019 against the Hamilton Tiger-Cats. In the following week's game against the Redblacks, Herdman-Reed suffered a separated shoulder injury and was out for the rest of the year.

Hamilton Tiger-Cats
Herdman-Reed signed with the Hamilton Tiger-Cats as a free agent to a one-year contract on February 11, 2020. However, the 2020 CFL season was cancelled and he never played in a game for the team as his contract expired in 2021.

Saskatchewan Roughriders
On the first day of free agency in 2021, Herdman-Reed signed with the Saskatchewan Roughriders on February 9, 2021.

Personal life
Herdman-Reed's twin brother, Jordan Herdman-Reed, who is two minutes older, also plays professionally as a linebacker for the Saskatchewan Roughriders. Their father, James Reed, was also a professional linebacker who played for the Philadelphia Eagles, Winnipeg Blue Bombers, Montreal Concordes, New Orleans Breakers, Washington Federals, Saskatchewan Roughriders, and Toronto Argonauts.

References

External links
Saskatchewan Roughriders bio

1994 births
Living people
Toronto Argonauts players
Canadian football linebackers
Saskatchewan Roughriders players
Simon Fraser Clan football players
Canadian football people from Winnipeg
Players of Canadian football from Manitoba
Canadian twins
Twin sportspeople